Olula de Castro is a municipality of Almería province, in the autonomous community of Andalusia, Spain.

It is located in the Sierra de Los Filabres.

Demographics

References

External links

  Olula de Castro - Sistema de Información Multiterritorial de Andalucía
  Olula de Castro - Diputación Provincial de Almería

Municipalities in the Province of Almería